Fox News was the original newsreel established by movie mogul William Fox. It was eventually replaced by Fox's pioneering sound newsreel, Fox Movietone News, which began regular operations in December 1927.

William Fox had great ambitions for his newsreel from the very beginning; he even managed to secure a letter from President Woodrow Wilson endorsing his newsreel. At its launch in 1919, Fox had already secured a network of cameramen spanning the globe.  Although the newsreel began acquiring stories in August 1919, the newsreel did not begin a regular, twice-weekly release until October 1919.  From the beginnings of its operations, Fox News main domestic rivals were Hearst News, Pathé News, International News and Kinograms.

When Fox Films ceased production of Fox News, the extensive library of unused and outtake film was folded into the Fox Movietone News library and was used internally as stock footage by Fox Films and 20th Century Fox until the corporation ceased production of Fox Movietone News in 1963.

As part of its gift of newsreel material to the University of South Carolina announced in 1979, 20th Century Fox donated all remaining elements from the original Fox News library. Estimated at 3 million feet of film, the original, camera‐negative nitrate film from this newsreel is arguably the most significant film record of American life, politics, and culture in the 1920s.

Fox News developed a comprehensive library system to keep track of the negative films being sent to New York from all over the world. Library story numbers were assigned to each roll of film and these numbers are still used today by the University of South Carolina to identify the films. On each "dope sheet" (i.e., the notes taken by newsreel cameramen in the field) was stamped a unique library number and this number was then written onto the tail of the film negative. Fox News story numbers run in series: 0001–9999, A0001–A9999, B0001–B9999, C0001–C9999, and D0001–D4444. The last films registered into the Fox News library date from April 1930.

The original library records from Fox News for those films donated to the University of South Carolina have been converted into an online database available for research. A comprehensive listing of companies and cameramen that submitted film to Fox News is available online. This listing provides names and locations of over 700 individuals and 170 businesses or organizations.

References

External links 
 Moving Image Research Collections, University of South Carolina

Newsreels
Fox Film